KCCR (1240 AM) is a radio station broadcasting a classic hits music format. Licensed to Pierre, South Dakota, United States, the station serves the Pierre area. The station is currently owned by Riverfront Broadcasting LLC.

KCCR signed on in May 1959 on 1590 kHz. It moved to 1240 kHz in 1965.

Ownership
In February 2008, Riverfront Broadcasting LLC reached an agreement with NRG Media to purchase this station as part of a six station deal.

References

External links

CCR
Classic hits radio stations in the United States
Riverfront Broadcasting LLC
Hughes County, South Dakota
1959 establishments in South Dakota
Radio stations established in 1959